Events in the year 1725 in Japan.

Incumbents
Monarch: Nakamikado

Deaths
January 6 - Chikamatsu Monzaemon, playwright (b. 1653)

 
1720s in Japan
Japan
Years of the 18th century in Japan